Daresbury railway station was a station in Moore, Cheshire, on the Birkenhead Joint Railway between Runcorn and Warrington. It was named after the village of Daresbury, Cheshire, about a mile away to distinguish it from Moore railway station on the West Coast Main Line. It was open to passengers between 1850 and 1952. It continued to be served by goods trains until full closure in 1965.

References

Further reading

Disused railway stations in the Borough of Halton
Former Birkenhead Railway stations
Railway stations in Great Britain opened in 1850
Railway stations in Great Britain closed in 1952